The Sin and the Sentence is the eighth studio album by American heavy metal band Trivium. It was released on October 20, 2017, through Roadrunner Records and was produced by Josh Wilbur. The album is the first to feature fifth drummer Alex Bent (formerly of Battlecross and currently of Brain Drill and Dragonlord), who replaced drummer Paul Wandtke. With the release of the album's title track, this album would also mark the return of frontman Matt Heafy's screaming vocals since the band's 2013 album Vengeance Falls, which were completely absent from the band's previous album Silence in the Snow due to an injury which caused Heafy to blow out his voice.

Upon its release, the album received critical acclaim, with the song "Betrayer" being nominated at 61st Annual Grammy Awards in 2019 for Best Metal Performance.

Background and promotion
Following the release of Silence in the Snow, then-drummer Mat Madiro left the band. An established touring drummer Paul Wandtke took Madiro's place in Trivium. In January 2017, rumors began to circulate which suggested that Wandtke would be leaving the band and would be replaced by Alex Bent. After a short time, both parties would confirm Wandtke's departure from the band as well as Bent's involvement with them.

In late July 2017, the band began releasing teasers online with cryptic images, lyrical passages, and video clips, with the accompanying Roman numeral "VIII.I". This would later be confirmed as representing August 1, the release date for a new single, "The Sin and the Sentence", with both the song and accompanying music video featuring Bent on drums. A second series of online teasers by the band would come just a few weeks afterwards, utilizing similar cryptic video clips with accompanying lyrical passages. This led to the eventual release of a second single, titled "The Heart from Your Hate". The song was first premiered exclusively on Octane on August 23. The next day, the band released both the song and a music video worldwide, as well as the track listing and release date for their eighth album, titled The Sin and the Sentence, on which both singles would be featured.

The song "The Wretchedness Inside" is taken from a demo Heafy ghostwrote for a different band in 2014. The song was never used, so the band re-recorded the song which appeared on The Sin and the Sentence instead.

In an interview with hardDrive, Heafy stated that the working title for the album was "The Revanchist" and that the album was going to have gold and neon colors, however those plans were changed once Heafy's wife, Ashley, presented the band with symbols for each accompanying song. The band then decided to use that artwork instead.

Composition
In an interview, bassist Paolo Gregoletto stated that new material is more 'extreme' and that the band would return to featuring screaming vocals on the new album. Speaking about the album at the Bandit Rock Q&A session, Paolo Gregoletto said that the album is "the perfect culmination of what we've been doing throughout the years", saying the band found a way to balance their heavy side with their melodic side. 7-string guitars are once again being used on The Sin and the Sentence, with the album being referred to as thrash metal, heavy metal and progressive metal; hearkening back to the sound of Ascendancy, Shogun, Silence in the Snow and In Waves. Paolo also goes on to say this album was not only one the band made for themselves as metal fans, but for loyal fans who have followed the band for years.

Critical reception

The Sin and the Sentence received critical acclaim.

Metal Hammer awarded the album four out of five stars, saying the album is "the first to meld every previous release into a 'very best of Trivium'" and praised the band that "determined to absorb all of their past and better it, showing once and for all who they are and what Trivium are: quite simply one of the best bands in modern metal."

Loudwire gave the album a positive review, noting the album's variety in featuring heavy, aggressive songs and ambitious songs as well as more melodic and accessible tracks, concluding that "Their songwriting and musicianship are as strong as they have ever been, with The Sin and the Sentence delivering a quality listen from beginning to end."

Decibel also wrote an editorial in which they recommended that readers "Give the new Trivium album a chance" despite acknowledging that the band's style of metal might not align with many of their readers' preferences, and highlighted the song "Betrayer", writing "Heroic guitar harmonies! Screaming vocals! Clean-singing choruses that stay in your head for hours! This is what I look for in a Trivium song."

AllMusic wrote a positive review, noting that "the band has never sounded more confident, delivering a positively lethal 11-song set that strikes the perfect balance between unhinged and meticulously crafted." They also added that "the addition of Bent, a powerhouse, hammer-of-the-gods-style kit man, and the newfound conviction of vocalist Matt Heafy, seem to have put a charge into the group," and that "The riffage is meaner and leaner, and the songs themselves -- especially the singles 'Heart from Your Hate' and the combustible title track—feel both lived-in and visceral, with highlights arriving via the serpentine, gang-vocal-led 'Beyond Oblivion' and the throat-mangling closer 'Thrown Into the Fire'."

Track listing

Note

Personnel
Credits are adapted from the album's liner notes.

Trivium
 Matt Heafy – lead vocals, guitars
 Corey Beaulieu – guitars, backing vocals
 Paolo Gregoletto – bass, backing vocals
 Alex Bent – drums, percussion

Additional musicians
 Too Late the Hero – gang vocals 
 Josh Wilbur, Jon Paul Douglass, Thomas Oliveira, Mike Miller, Josh Brooks, Gerardo Carrero, Jonathan Carrion, Kevin Martincowski, Daniel Rodriguez, Brandon Diaz, Elijah Rojas – gang vocals

Production
 Josh Wilbur – producer, engineering, mixing, mastering
 Nick Rowe – engineering
 Kevin Billingslea – engineering 
 Ashley Heafy – cover art, layout, design
 Jon Paul Douglass – art direction, photography

Charts

References

2017 albums
Trivium (band) albums
Roadrunner Records albums